Bobby Collins (born Bobby Eugene Collins) is a former tight end in the National Football League. Collins was drafted in the fourth round of the 1999 NFL Draft by the Buffalo Bills and played two seasons with the team. He would play the 2001 NFL season with the Green Bay Packers.

References

1976 births
Living people
American football tight ends
Buffalo Bills players
East Mississippi Lions football players
Green Bay Packers players
North Alabama Lions football players
People from Sumter County, Alabama